The Chuwan Crab Museum is a museum about crabs in Zhuwan village, Xiyu Township, Penghu County, Taiwan.

The museum was opened on 1 April 2004. It displays various kinds of crabs found around Penghu Islands.

See also
 List of museums in Taiwan

References

2004 establishments in Taiwan
Crabs
Museums established in 2004
Museums in Penghu County